Rhinoplatia is a genus of false blister beetles in the family Oedemeridae. There are at least two described species in Rhinoplatia.

Species
These two species belong to the genus Rhinoplatia:
 Rhinoplatia mortivallicola Arnett, 1947
 Rhinoplatia ruficollis Horn, 1868

References

Further reading

 
 

Oedemeridae
Articles created by Qbugbot